Elizabeth Kennedy may refer to:

Libby Kennedy, Neighbours character
Elizabeth Lapovsky Kennedy (born 1939), feminist and lesbian historian
Liz Kennedy, character in The Young Doctors
Betty Kennedy (1926–2017), Canadian broadcaster
Elizabeth M. Kennedy (died 1958), president of the Women's Engineering Society